Dominican High School may refer to:

 Dominican High School (Galveston, Texas), United States
 Dominican High School (Whitefish Bay, Wisconsin), United States
 St. Mary's Dominican High School, New Orleans, Louisiana, United States
 Dominican High School (Detroit), Michigan, United States

See also
 Dominican Convent High School, Harare
 Dominican Convent High School, Bulawayo